Sunshine Sports Park (Chinese: 陽光運動公園站; Pinyin: Yángguāng yùndòng gōngyuán zhàn) is a light rail station of the Ankeng light rail, operated by the New Taipei Metro, in Xindian, New Taipei, Taiwan.

Station overview
The station is an elevated station with 2 side platforms. It is located on Section 2, Anhe Road, near the intersection of Anli Street.

Station layout

Around the station

 Sunshine Sports Park

Bus connections
Buses 8, 202, 208, 248, 576, 624, 897, 913, 935, O1, and O9 stop at this station.

History
Construction of the station started on November 7, 2014, and was completed in 2022. The station opened on February 10, 2023.

See also

 Ankeng light rail
 New Taipei Metro
 Rail transport in Taiwan

References

External links
 New Taipei Metro Corporation

 New Taipei City Department of Rapid Transit

Ankeng light rail stations